The Longworth House Office Building (LHOB) is one of five office buildings used by the United States House of Representatives. The building is located south of the Capitol, bounded by Independence Avenue, New Jersey Avenue, C Street S.E., and South Capitol Street, in southeast Washington.

The building was named in 1962 in honor of the former Speaker of the House, Nicholas Longworth of Ohio. He served as Speaker from 1925 until Republicans lost their majority in 1931, the same year he died, and the same year the building was authorized.

Description 
With a floor area of just under , it is the smallest of the House office buildings.

History

Construction 

Plans to provide the House of Representatives with a second office building were begun in 1925. Severe overcrowding in the Cannon House Office Building (completed in 1908) led to the renovation of the Cannon Building and the construction of the Longworth Building".

Under the direction of Architect of the Capitol David Lynn, preliminary designs for the building were prepared by a local firm known as The Allied Architects of Washington Inc. The principal architects were Frank Upman, Gilbert LaCoste Rodier, Nathan C. Wyeth, and Louis Justemente. They produced "two schemes for a simple, dignified building in harmony with the rest of the Capitol Complex. In January 1929 Congress authorized $8.4 million for acquiring and clearing the site and for constructing the new building. The foundations were completed in December 1930, and the building was accepted for occupancy in April 1933".

The site of the building had previously been occupied by the Butler Building, which was the headquarters of the Public Health Service; and the Richards Building, the headquarters of the Coast and Geodetic Survey, which were both demolished.

Later history 
The large assembly room of the Longworth Building, which seats 450 people, was used by the House of Representatives as their primary meeting room in 1949 and 1950 while its chamber in the United States Capitol was being remodeled. It is currently the meeting room for the House Ways and Means Committee. In the 1960s, the House Beauty Shop, a salon which catered to Congresspersons, their spouses, and employees, was relocated to the Cannon House Office Building from the smaller Longworth House Office Building under the auspices of the Beauty Shop Committee.

References

External links
 Three Bits of Trivia About the Longworth House Office Building - Ghosts of DC blog post
 3D SketchUp model of the Longworth House Office Building for use in Google Earth

Congressional office buildings
Government buildings completed in 1933
Neoclassical architecture in Washington, D.C.
1933 establishments in Washington, D.C.